The Charles Walton Beam House, also known as the Walter Cowart House, is a historic house in McCall Creek, Mississippi, U.S.. It was built in the 1850s for Charles Walton Beam, a landowner and politician. It was designed in the Greek Revival architectural style. It has been listed on the National Register of Historic Places since March 21, 1990.

References

Houses on the National Register of Historic Places in Mississippi
Greek Revival houses in Mississippi
National Register of Historic Places in Franklin County, Mississippi